"Lincoln and Liberty Too" was a campaign song supporting Republican Abraham Lincoln in the 1860 United States presidential election.

History
Attributed to Jesse Hutchinson, Jr. of the Hutchinson Family Singers the song adapted from the tune of "Old Rosin the Beau" and was originally called "Liberty Ball."  The title echoes earlier songs with the same melody as "Adams and Liberty" and repeated in later campaign songs.  Shortly after Jesse's death in 1853, the song was modified to support Lincoln's presidency.  The song was last sung by the Hutchinson Family at the 1892 dedication for the statue of John P. Hale. Frederick Douglass also was present and sang with the Hutchinson Family.

The song expresses themes of abolitionism and log cabin virtues, with the chorus also expansively establishing Lincoln as a favorite son of three states (Kentucky, Indiana and Illinois). The Hutchinson family traveled through the country singing the song at Lincoln campaign rallies and even in the White House. Another version of the song, sung by Ronnie Gilbert and ostensibly written by Jesse Hutchinson, praises abolitionism and emancipation, and condemns racism.

In the novel Paradise Alley by Kevin Baker, young Republicans sang the song in a political rally (see pg. 422).

The song became the official campaign song for President Lincoln's campaign.  Rallies supporting Lincoln sang the song, and it was also published in The Hutchinson's Republican Songster.

Lyrics

Verses concerning the abolition of slavery which have sometimes been added to performances of "Lincoln and Liberty" belong more properly to "The Liberty Ball," an earlier song written by George W. Clark to the same tune and published in 1845:

See also

 "Tippecanoe and Tyler Too"

References

Further reading
Silber, Irwin (1971). Songs America Voted By. Harrisburg, Pennsylvania: Stackpole Books.
Ward, William R. (1975). The American Bicentennial Songbook Volume 1: 1770 - 1870s, New York, NY, 1975, pp. 163. 
Lincoln and Liberty, Ballad of America: Matthew Sabatella and the Rambling String Band.
Lincoln and Liberty: Music From Abraham Lincoln's Era.
The Liberty Ball.  Poetry and Music of the War between States.

External links

1860 songs
Political party songs
Songs about freedom
1860 United States presidential election
Abraham Lincoln
Republican Party (United States) presidential campaigns